Senator McClintock may refer to:

Jonas R. McClintock (1808–1879), Pennsylvania State Senate
Kenneth McClintock (born 1957), Senate of Puerto Rico
Tom McClintock (born 1956), California State Senate

See also
James V. McClintic (1878–1948), Oklahoma State Senate